Big School-Break (or Big Break translit. Bolshaya Peremena) is a Soviet 1972 TV miniseries in 4 episodes. It was known in the US as The Long Recess, and it is loosely based on Georgy Sadovnikov's novel Walk towards people (Иду к людям).

Plot summary 

Nestor Petrovich Severov, a student preparing to start his PhD in Russian history, has his ego bruised by his girl-friend, who beats him on their entrance exam. He starts working at a night school, having had his spot at a graduate program taken away by the young woman. He soon finds out that teaching adults can be very hard, especially when they aren't willing to learn.

Cast 
 Mikhail Kononov as Nestor Petrovich Severov, the history teacher
 Yevgeny Leonov as Stepan Lednyov
 Rolan Bykov as Alexander Petrykin
 Aleksandr Zbruyev as Grigory Ganzha
 Svetlana Kryuchkova as Nelli
 Yanis Yakobson as Nelli neighbor's party
 Yuriy Kuzmenkov as Fedoskin
 Natalya Bogunova as Svetlana Afanasyevna
 Natalya Gvozdikova as Polina
 Savely Kramarov as Timokhin
 Viktor Proskurin as Gena Lyapishev
 Valery Nosik as Otto Fukin
 Nina Maslova as Korovyanskaya
 Iren Azer as Lyus'ka
 Valeri Khlevinsky as Avdotyin
 Lyudmila Kasatkina as The School Director
 Mikhail Yanshin as Professor Volosyuk
 Valentina Sperantova as The School Janitor
 Lev Durov as Militiaman
 Lyusyena Ovchinnikova as Valya, Petrykin's bride
 Lev Dubov as Engineer
 Anastasiya Georgiyevskaya, Valentina Talyzina, Nina Zhilina, Lyudmila Antsiferova, Valentina Kuznetsova as The School Teachers
 Vladimir Basov as photographer at the wedding Petrykin's 
Elya Baskin as pupil 
 Nikolai Grabbe as Tarasov  
 Ivan Ryzhov as Police Major, head of the department 
 Valentina Ananina (episode) 
 Mikhail Remizov (episode)
 Vladimir Zemlyanikin as friend Petrykin's
 Gotlib Roninson as Brigadier
 Yelena Koreneva as girl in library
 Valentina Titova as wedding guests
 Pyotr Shcherbakov as guest

Production

Film locations
The film was shot in Yaroslavl (Central Park, Kotoroslnaya embankment, Damansky Island etc.) and Moscow (Moscow State Pedagogical University).

References

External links

 Bolshaya Peremena 35 years ago 
 How Bolshaya Peremena was filmed at Lev Durov's website 

1972 films
1973 films
1972 romantic comedy films
1973 romantic comedy films
1970s Russian-language films
Soviet television miniseries
1970s Soviet television series
Soviet romantic comedy films
Russian romantic comedy films
Films shot in Moscow
Films shot in Yaroslavl Oblast
1970s television miniseries